Sack of Rome may refer to:

Historical events
Sack of Rome (390 BC) after the Battle of the Allia, by Brennus, king of the Senone Gauls
Sack of Rome (410), by Visigoths under Alaric I
Sack of Rome (455), by Vandals under Genseric
Sack of Rome (472), by germanic foederati under Ricimer
Sack of Rome (546), by Ostrogoths under King Totila
Siege of Rome (549–550), also by Totila
Sack of Rome (1084), by Robert Guiscard's Normans
Sack of Rome (1527), by  mercenary troops of Holy Roman Emperor Charles V

Other uses
 The Sack of Rome (film), a 1920 Italian film depicting the 1527 event
The Sack of Rome: How a Beautiful European Country with a Fabled History and a Storied Culture Was Taken Over by a Man Named Silvio Berlusconi, a book by Alexander Stille
, an essay by Andre Chastel
"Sack of Rome", a chess tournament victory by Sofia Polgar

See also 

 Arab raid against Rome (846)
 Battle for Rome (disambiguation)
 Battle of Rome (disambiguation)
 Capture of Rome
 Fall of Rome (disambiguation)
 Siege of Rome (disambiguation)